Kim Hak-kyun (born November 15, 1971) is a retired male badminton player from South Korea.

Career
Kim competed in badminton at the 1992 Summer Olympics in men's singles. He lost in quarterfinals to Alan Budikusuma, of Indonesia, 15-9, 15-4.  After retiring, he spent many years as a national team coach and in mid-2015, he became Head Coach of the Korean junior national badminton team.

Achievements

Asian Games 
Men's singles

IBF World Grand Prix 
The World Badminton Grand Prix sanctioned by International Badminton Federation (IBF) from 1983 to 2006.

Men's singles

References

 

South Korean male badminton players
Olympic badminton players of South Korea
Badminton players at the 1992 Summer Olympics
Badminton players at the 1996 Summer Olympics
Asian Games medalists in badminton
1971 births
Living people
Badminton players at the 1994 Asian Games
Badminton players at the 1990 Asian Games
Asian Games silver medalists for South Korea
Asian Games bronze medalists for South Korea
Medalists at the 1990 Asian Games
Medalists at the 1994 Asian Games
20th-century South Korean people
21st-century South Korean people